The vallée d'Aure is located in the French Pyrenees, in the Hautes-Pyrénées department, in the region of Midi-Pyrénées.

Geography 
The vallée d'Aure is part of the pays d'Aure, of which the historical capital is Arreau.

It corresponds to the upper flow of the Neste or Neste d'Aure. It spans about 40 km from Sarrancolin to the Spanish border, accessible by the Aragnouet-Bielsa tunnel.

Vallée d'Aure lakes

Main communes 

 Arreau
 Gouaux
 Sarrancolin
 Bourisp
 Ancizan
 Guchen
 Guchan
 Grézian
 Cadéac
 Cadeilhan-Trachère
 Lançon
 Camparan
 Grailhen
 Bazus-Aure
 Barrancoueu
 Vignec
 Sailhan
 Estensan
 Azet
 Beyrède-Jumet
 Ilhet
 Vielle-Aure
 Saint-Lary-Soulan
 Tramezaïgues
 Aragnouet and the hamlets of Eget, Fabian, Le Plan
 Aspin-Aure
 Pailhac
 Jézeau

Mineralogy 
The vallée d'Are has the particularity of disposing of remarkable mineral deposits such as byssolite, tremolite or prehnite.

Flora and fauna 

The Aure et Saint-Girons ~ or Auroise ~ is a breed of cattle endemic to the valley.

History 
Chemin de la Vallée d'Aure

Skying resorts 
 Saint-Lary-Soulan
 Piau-Engaly
 Nistos (alpine and cross-country skiing)

References

Pyrenees
Landforms of Hautes-Pyrénées
Valleys of France